= Rudraraju Padmaraju =

Indian politician

Member of Legislative Council
- In office 2009

Personal details
- Party: Telugu Desam Party

Rudraraju Padmaraju is an Indian politician and an MLC in Andhra Pradesh. He belongs to Telugu Desam Party. He hails from East Godavari district.
